Triston Andrew McKenzie (born August 2, 1997) is an American professional baseball pitcher for the Cleveland Guardians of Major League Baseball (MLB). He was drafted by the Cleveland Indians with the 42nd overall selection of the 2015 Major League Baseball draft. He made his MLB debut in 2020.

Amateur career
McKenzie attended Royal Palm Beach High School in Royal Palm Beach, Florida. In 2015, his senior year, he had a 9–5 win–loss record with a 0.79 earned run average (ERA). He was drafted by the Indians with the 42nd overall selection of the 2015 Major League Baseball draft. He signed for $2.3 million, forgoing his commitment to play college baseball at Vanderbilt University.

Professional career
McKenzie spent 2015, his first professional season, with the Arizona League Indians (rookie winter league) where he posted a 0.75 ERA in 12 innings pitched. In 2016, McKenzie began the season with the Mahoning Valley Scrappers (rookie summer league) before being promoted to the Lake County Captains (high A league); he posted a combined 1.62 ERA with 104 strikeouts in  innings pitched between the two teams. In 2017, McKenzie played for the Lynchburg Hillcats (A league) where he posted a 12–6 record with a 3.46 ERA in 25 games started. That same year, he pitched in the All-Star Futures Game. In 2018, he spent the season with the Akron RubberDucks (Double A), going 7–4 with a 2.68 ERA over  innings. MLB Pipeline ranked McKenzie as Cleveland's first ranked prospect entering into the 2019 season. In 2019, he missed the season due to lat and pectoral muscle strains. Following the season, McKenzie was added to the Indians 40-man roster.

On August 22, 2020, McKenzie made his major league debut against the Detroit Tigers, striking out ten batters in six innings; McKenzie's 10 strikeouts in his debut performance are the second most by an Indians pitcher in their first major league start. With the 2020 Cleveland Indians, McKenzie appeared in 8 games, compiling a 2–1 record with 3.24 ERA and 42 strikeouts in  innings pitched.

McKenzie began the 2021 season as a member of Cleveland's starting rotation. On May 22, 2021, McKenzie was optioned to the Triple-A Columbus Clippers after compiling a 1–3 record, a 6.89 ERA, and 30 walks over  innings. McKenzie was recalled on May 26, and on May 31 against the Chicago White Sox, he set the Indians franchise record for most consecutive strikeouts, punching out 8 White Sox hitters in a row. McKenzie was demoted again after a poor outing on June 12, due in great part to his high rate of walking batters. He was recalled for a spot start on July 9, in which he pitched seven shutout innings, giving up just one hit and one walk, while striking out nine Kansas City Royals batters.

Prior to the 2022 season, Marcus Stroman publicly promised on Twitter that he would buy McKenzie a Rolex watch if he pitched more than 160 innings that season and finished with an ERA below 3.70. He finished the year with an 11–11 record and 2.96 ERA in 191.1 innings. It was described in The Athletic as a "breakout season." McKenzie called it "refreshing."

Personal
McKenzie's younger brother, T.J., was drafted by the St. Louis Cardinals in the 39th round of the 2019 Major League Baseball draft and currently plays college baseball at Vanderbilt University.

References

External links

1997 births
Living people
African-American baseball players
Akron RubberDucks players
Arizona League Indians players
Baseball players from New York (state)
Cleveland Indians players
Cleveland Guardians players
Lake County Captains players
Lynchburg Hillcats players
Mahoning Valley Scrappers players
Major League Baseball pitchers
Sportspeople from Brooklyn
Baseball players from New York City
21st-century African-American sportspeople